John Bigelow (1817–1911) was an American diplomat.

John Bigelow may also refer to:
 John P. Bigelow (1797–1872), American politician
 John Bigelow, Jr. (1854–1936), American cavalry officer and son of American diplomat John Bigelow
 John Bigelow IV (born 2001), American golfer
 Jackie Cooper (1922–2011), child actor brought up as John Bigelow